The Trip is a 1976 jazz album by saxophonist Art Pepper playing with George Cables, David Williams and Elvin Jones.

This album features The Trip, one of Art Pepper's own melodies written in 1963 while in San Quentin. Pepper likened jazz to the storytelling that took place between the prisoners. As he says in the sleeve notes, "When I play,... the sound that comes out of this thing, this piece of metal is just me saying these things and taking people on a trip."

Track listing 
"The Trip" (Art Pepper) – 8:55
"A Song For Richard" (Joe Gordon) – 6:17
"Sweet Love Of Mine" (Woody Shaw) – 6:34
"Junior Cat" (Art Pepper) – 7:46
"The Summer Knows" (Michel Legrand, Marilyn & Alan Bergman) – 7:09
"Red Car" (Art Pepper) – 5:45
(Recorded on 15–16 September 1976.)

Personnel 
 Art Pepper – alto saxophone
 George Cables – piano
 David Williams – bass
 Elvin Jones – drums

References

Sources 
 Richard Cook & Brian Morton. The Penguin Guide to Jazz on CD 4th edition. Penguin, 1998. 

Art Pepper albums
1977 albums
Contemporary Records albums
Original Jazz Classics albums